A crooked spire, (also known as a twisted spire) is a tower that, through accident or design, contains a twist or does not point perfectly straight upwards.  There are about a hundred bell towers of this type in Europe.

Austria 
 Alpbach, Tyrol - Saint Oswald
 Bad Ischl, Upper Austria - Saint Nicholas
 Mayrhofen, Tyrol - church
 Oetz, Imst - Saints George & Nicholas
 Virgen, Lienz - church
 Wagrain, St. Johann im Pongau District - Saint Rupert
 Zell am Ziller, Schwaz - Saint Guy

Belgium 
 Baelen, Liège - Saint Paul
 Herve, Liège Province - Saint John the Baptist
 Jalhay, Liège Province - Saint Michael
 Jodoigne, Walloon Brabant - Chapel of Notre Dame du Marche
 Lierneux, Liège Province - church
 Limbourg, Liège Province - Saint Lambert
 Leernes, Hainaut Province - Saint Martin
 Marchin, Liège Province - parish church
 Polleur, Theux - Saint Jacques
 Roosdaal, Flemish Brabant - xiiie siècle
 Sart-lez-Spa, Jalhay - Saint Lambert
 Verlaine, Liège Province - Saint Remy

Canada 
 Clarke's Head, Newfoundland and Labrador - Christ Church

Denmark 
 Copenhagen - Stock Exchange
 Copenhagen - Church of Our Saviour

England 
 Barnstaple, Devon - St. Peter's church
 Chesterfield, Derbyshire - Church of St Mary and All Saints
 Cleobury Mortimer, Shropshire - St Mary's Church
 Clitheroe, Lancashire - Church of St Mary Magdalene
 Ermington, Devon - Church of St Peter and St Paul 
 Ewhurst Green, East Sussex - St James's Church
 Hadleigh, Suffolk - Church of St Mary

France 
 Aignay-le-Duc, Côte-d'Or - Saint-Pierre-et-Saint-Paul
 Angiens, Seine-Maritime - church
 Attignat, Ain - Saint Loup
 Aubigny-sur-Nère, Cher - tower
 Auppegard, Seine-Maritime - Church of St. Pierre
 Auxonne, Côte-d'Or - Notre Dame
 Barran, Gers - College of St Jean Baptiste
 Boësses, Loiret - church
 Boulancourt, Seine-et-Marne - Saint Denis
 Bourges, Cher - Bell tower
 Breuvannes-en-Bassigny, Haute-Marne - Saint George
 Bures-en-Bray, Seine-Maritime - Saint Aignan
 Ceyzériat, Ain - Saint Laurent
 Châteauroux, Indre - Lucarne
 Cheffes, Maine-et-Loire - church
 Chemiré-sur-Sarthe, Maine-et-Loire - Church of Saint Jacques
 Courcelles-Chaussy, Lorraine - Tower
 Coussay-les-Bois, Vienne - Saint Martin
 Dinéault, Finistère - Arrow tower
 Distré, Maine-et-Loire - Church of Saint Julien
 Dohis, Aisne - church of the Nativité-de-la-Sainte-Vierge
 Drancy, Seine-Saint-Denis - tower
 Échirolles, Isère - construction on a building
 Étréaupont, Aisne - Saint Martin
 Étoges, Marne - church
 Fontaine-Guérin, Maine-et-Loire - Church of St Martin
 Fougere, Maine-et-Loire - Saint Etienne
 Gigny, Yonne - Saint Leger
 Hectomare, Eure - Saint Taurin
 Houville-la-Branche, Eure-et-Loir - church
 Jarzé, Maine-et-Loire - Saint Cyr et Sainte Julitte
 Javerlhac-et-la-Chapelle-Saint-Robert, Dordogne - Saint Etienne
 Labergement-lès-Seurre, Côte-d'Or - church
 La Tour-d'Auvergne, Auvergne - Saint Pardoux
 Le Vieil-Baugé, Maine-et-Loire - Saint-Symphorien church
 Les Grands-Chézeaux, Haute-Vienne - Lantern on a roof of a house
 Malville, Loire-Atlantique - tower
 Marçon, Pays de la Loire - Church of Notre Dame
 Mervans, Saône-et-Loire - Saint-Maurice
 Meslay-du-Maine, Mayenne - Saint Pierre
 Mouliherne, Maine-et-Loire - Saint Germaine
 Naillat, Limousin - Saint Medard
 Niedermorschwihr, Haut-Rhin - Saint Gall and Saint Weldelin
 Nogent-sur-Vernisson, Loiret - construction on a house
 Nohant-en-Graçay, Cher - Saint Martin
 Offranville, Seine-Maritime - Church of St.Ouen
 Orléans, Loiret - Lantern roof on a house
 Payzac, Dordogne - Church of the Transfigeration
 Plougrescant, Brittany - Saint Gonery
 Pontigné, Maine-et-Loire - St Denis
 Puiseaux, Loiret - Notre Dame
 Québriac, Ille-et-Vilaine - Saint Pierre
 Reugny, Indre-et-Loire - Saint Medard
 Rochechouart, Haute-Vienne - Saint Saviours
 Rodelle, Aveyron - Church of Lagnac
 Saint-Aubin-sur-Gaillon, Eure - Saint Germain
 Saint-Bonnet-de-Four, l'Allier - Saint Bonnet
 Saint-Côme-d'Olt, Aveyron - Saint Come
 Saint-Outrille, Cher - College of Saint-Austrégésile de Saint-Outrille
 Saint-Côme-d'Olt, Aveyron - Church of Saint-Côme-d'Olt
 Saint-Pierre-des-Échaubrognes, Deux-Sèvres - church
 Saint-Viâtre, Loir-et-Cher - Saint Viatre
 Saumur, Maine-et-Loire - Saint Pierre
 Sérignac-sur-Garonne, Lot-et-Garonne - Notre Dame
 Treignac, Corrèze - Chapel of Notre Dame de la Paix
 Troyes, Aube - Saint Remy
 Verchin, Pas-de-Calais - St Omer church
 Vézelise, Meurthe-et-Moselle - Saint Côme et Damien
 Vieil-Baugé, Maine-et-Loire - church
 Vitteaux, Côte-d'Or - Saint Germain

Germany 
 Ballstädt, Gotha (district)  - church
 Barntrup, North Rhine-Westphalia - church
 Breidenbach, Hesse - 
 Burgwedel, Lower Saxony - Saint Pierre
 Delbrück, North Rhine-Westphalia- Saint-Jean-Baptiste
 Duderstadt, Lower Saxony - Town gatehouse
 Düsseldorf, North Rhine-Westphalia -  St Lambertus
 Grötzingen, Karlsruhe - Evangelical church
Hardthausen am Kocher, Baden-Wuerttemberg - Protestant Church Gochsen
 Hattingen, North Rhine-Westphalia - Saint-Georges
 Kaisersesch, Rhineland-Palatinate - Saint Pancrase
 Lage, Lippe - Saint Peter & Saint Paul
 Lemgo, Lippe - Saint Nicholas
 Lüneburg, Lower Saxony - St John's Church
 Mayen, Rhineland-Palatinate - Church of St Clemens
 Mülheim, North Rhine-Westphalia - Saint Pierre
 Münzenberg, Hesse - church
 Neuwied, Rhineland-Palatinate - Sainte Marguerite
 Northeim, Lower Saxony - Saint Sixt
 Oberwesel, Rhineland-Palatinate - Notre Dame
 Ochsenfurt, Lower Franconia - Maria Schnee
 Porta Westfalica, Minden-Lübbecke - church
 Sandstedt, Lower Saxony - Saint Jean
 Stolzenau, Lower Saxony - Saint Jacques
 Uslar, Lower Saxony - Saint Jean

Italy 
 Rome - Sant'Ivo alla Sapienza

Scotland 
 Cupar, Fife - Church of Cupar Old and St Michael of Tarvit
 Inverness, - Town Steeple

Switzerland 
 Davos, Canton of Grisons - Saint Johann
 Muttenz, Basel-Landschaft - Fortified Church of St. Arbogast
 Payerne, Canton of Vaud - Payerne Priory
 Stein am Rhein, Canton of Schaffhausen - St. George

United States of America 
 Setauket, New York - Caroline Church of Brookhaven

Other crooked or twisted spires
Hobsons Brewery, Worcestershire, produces a beer named "Twisted Spire".
 Spire Brewery is named for Chesterfield's landmark twisted spire.
"Crooked Spire" Pubs exist at Chesterfield  and Ermington 
Architects have been inspired to create twisted buildings such as the Turning Torso

See also
Crooked spire
Spire

External links
 l’Association des Clochers Tors d’Europe (A.C.T.E.)

References

Spires, twisted
Spires, twisted